The Campeonato Alagoano Segunda Divisão (English: Campeonato Alagoano Second Division) is the second tier of the football league of the state of Alagoas, Brazil.

Format
2020 Second Division
The five clubs face each other in a simple round-robin, in which all teams play each other once. The two best-placed teams qualify to the Finals.
A single match is played to decide who is the Campeonato Alagoano Second Division winner. Only the winner achieves promotion to the First Division.

Clubs
2022 Second Division

List of champions

Following is the list with all the champions of the second level of Alagoas.

Notes

Titles by team

Teams in bold stills active.

By city

References

External links
  
 Campeonato Alagoano Second Division at RSSSF

 
State football leagues in Brazil